Cerone is a surname. Notable people with the surname include:

Rick Cerone (born 1954), American baseball player
Jackie Cerone (1914–1996), American mobster
Daniel Cerone, American script writer
David Cerone, American musician and teacher
Pietro Cerone (1566–1625), Italian music theorist